Sanjana Santosh (born 2 March 1997) is an Indian badminton player.

Achievements

BWF International Challenge/Series (3 titles, 1 runner-up) 
Women's doubles

  BWF International Challenge tournament
  BWF International Series tournament
  BWF Future Series tournament

References

External links
 

Living people
1997 births
Indian female badminton players